Alapadamba  is a village situated in Payyanur taluk of Kannur district in the Indian state of Kerala.

Demographics
As of 2011 India census, Alappadamba had total population of 8,660 where 4,173 are males and 4,487 are females. Alappadamba village spreads over an area of 25.25 km2 with 2,233 families residing in it. The sex ratio was 1,075, lower than state average of 1,084. In Alappadamba, Population of children under 6 years was 8.9%. Alappadamba had overall literacy of 93.5%, higher than national average of 59% and lower than state average of 94%.

References

Villages near Payyanur